The Benktander type II distribution, also called the Benktander distribution of the second kind, is one of two distributions introduced by Gunnar  to model heavy-tailed losses commonly found in non-life/casualty actuarial science, using various forms of mean excess functions . This distribution is "close" to the Weibull distribution .

See also 
 Weibull distribution
 Benktander type I distribution

Notes

References

Continuous distributions